Ibal pi’el II was a king of the city kingdom of Eshnunna in ancient Mesopotamia. He reigned c. 1779–1765 BC).

He was the son of Dadusha and nephew of Naram-Suen of Eshnunna.

He conquered the cities of Diniktum and Rapiqum. With Ḫammu-rāpi of Babylon, and the Amorite king Shamshi-Adad I he besieged the kingdom of Malgium until its ruler bought them off with 15 talents of silver.

He was a contemporary of Zimri-Lim of Mari, and formed powerful alliances with  Yarim-Lim I Amud-pi-el of Qatanum, Rim-Sin I of Larsa and most importantly Hammurabi of Babylon, to appose the rise of Shamshi-Adad I in Assyria (on his northern border) who himself had alliances with Charchemish, Hassum and Urshu and Qatna.

Some scholars have suggested the biblical king Amraphel may have been Ibal Pi-El II of Esnunna. While others consider Ameraphel to be Hammurabi.

He was killed by Siwe-Palar-Khuppak of Elam, who captured Eshnunna, and he was succeeded by Silli-Sin.

References

18th-century BC Sumerian kings
Kings of Eshnunna